Anocracy or semi-democracy is a form of government that is loosely defined as part democracy and part dictatorship, or as a "regime that mixes democratic with autocratic features." Another definition classifies anocracy as "a regime that permits some means of participation through opposition group behavior but that has incomplete development of mechanisms to redress grievances." The term "semi-democratic" is reserved for stable regimes that combine democratic and authoritarian elements. Scholars have also distinguished anocracies from autocracies and democracies in their capability to maintain authority, political dynamics, and policy agendas. Similarly, the regimes have democratic institutions that allow for nominal amounts of competition.

Such regimes are particularly susceptible to outbreaks of armed conflict and unexpected or adverse changes in leadership.

The operational definition of anocracy is extensively used by scholars Monty G. Marshall and Benjamin R. Cole at the Center for Systemic Peace, which gained most of its dissemination through the polity data series. The data set aims to measure democracy in different states and retains anocracy as one of its classification methods for regime type. Consequently, anocracy frequently appears in democratization literature that utilizes the polity-data set.

Unlike traditional democracy, semi-democratic regimes, also known as hybrid regimes, are known for having guided democracy instead of liberal democracy. Semi-dictatorial regimes have dictatorial powers with some democratic values, and despite being authoritarian, have elections. In a closed anocracy, competitors are drawn from the elite. In an open anocracy, others also compete.

The number of anocratic regimes has steadily increased over time, with the most notable jump occurring after the end of the Cold War. From 1989 to 2013, the number of anocracies increased from 30 to 53.

Characteristics

Human rights 

The instability of anocratic regimes causes human rights violations to be significantly higher within anocracies than democratic regimes. According to Maplecroft's 2014 Human Rights Risk Atlas, eight of the top ten worst human rights violating countries are anocracies. In addition, the report categorized every current anocracy as "at risk" or at "extreme risk" of human rights offenses.

The high correlation between anocratic regimes and human rights abuses denotes the nonlinear progression in a country's transition from an autocracy to a democracy. Generally, human rights violations substantially decrease when a certain threshold of full democracy is reached. However, human rights abuses tend to remain the same or even to increase as countries move from an autocratic to an anocratic regime.

During the revolutions of the Arab Spring, Libya, Egypt, and Yemen, all of the countries made relative progress towards more democratic regimes. With many of the authoritarian practices of their governments remaining, those states currently fall under the category of anocracies. They are also listed as some of the most extreme human rights violating countries in the world. The violations include torture, police brutality, slavery, discrimination, unfair trials, and restricted freedom of expression. Research has shown that political protests, such as those that occurred during the Arab Spring, generally lead to an increase in human right violations, as the existing government tries to retain power and influence over governmental opposition. Therefore, transitioning governments tend to have high levels of human rights abuses.

In its annual Freedom in the World report, Freedom House scored states’ violations of civil liberties on a seven-point scale, with a score of seven representing the highest percentage of violations. Freedom House defined civil liberty violations as the infringement of freedom of expression, associational and organizational rights, rule of law, and individual rights. Most consolidated democracies received scores of one, but almost all anocracies were scored between four and six because of the high percentage of civil liberties violations in most anocratic regimes.

Violence 
Statistics show that anocracies are ten times more likely to experience intrastate conflict than democracies and twice as likely as autocracies. One explanation for the increase in violence and conflict within anocracies is a theory known as More Murder in the Middle (MMM). The theory argues that the unstable characteristics of anocratic regimes, which include the presence of divided elites, inequality, and violent challengers who threaten the legitimacy of the current social order, cause governing elites to resort to much more political repression or state terror than do democratic or authoritarian regimes. That leads to high levels of what are termed "life-integrity violations," which include state-sponsored genocide, extrajudicial executions, and torture.

State life-integrity violations can be categorized as acts of state terror. Acts of terrorism by both governmental and outside groups are generally higher in transitioning anocratic governments than in either democratic or authoritarian regimes. Harvard Public Policy Professor Alberto Abadie argues that the tight control of authoritarian regime is likely to discourage terrorist activities in the state. However, without the stability of a clear authoritarian rule or a consolidated democracy, anocracies are more open and susceptible to terrorist attacks. He notes that in Iraq and previously Spain and Russia, transitions from an authoritarian regime to a democracy were accompanied by temporary increases in terrorism.

According to the political terror scale (PTS), a data set that ranks state sponsored violence on a five-point scale, almost every anocracy is ranked as having a score between three and five. On the scale, a score of three indicates that in a state, "there is extensive political imprisonment, or a recent history of such imprisonment. Execution or other political murders and brutality may be common. Unlimited detention, with or without a trial, for political views is accepted." States are ranked as a four when "civil and political rights violations have expanded to large numbers of the population. Murders, disappearances and torture are a common part of life. In spite of its generality, on this level terror affects those who interest themselves in politics or ideas." Scores of five are given to states if "terror has expanded to the whole population. The leaders of these societies place no limits on the means or thoroughness with which they pursue personal or ideological goals." Although only eleven states were given scores of five in the 2012 Political Terror Scale report, four of those states, the Democratic Republic of the Congo, Eritrea, Somalia, and Sudan, were classified by the polity data series as anocracies.

Civil war
There are differing views on whether or not anocracy leads to civil war. It is debated whether or not transitions between government regimes or political violence lead to civil war.

Civil war in unstable countries are usually the outcome of a country's inability to meet the population's demands. The inability for the state to provide the needs of the population leads to factionalism within the country. When factions are not able to get what they want, they take up arms against the state.

Former democracies that transition to anocracy have a greater risk of being embroiled in civil conflict. The population's awareness of what rights they had as a democratic society may compel them to fight to regain their rights and liberties. On the other hand, autocracies that transition into anocracies are less likely to break out in civil war. Not all anocracies are unstable. There are many countries that are stable but are classified as anocracies, such as Russia. It is the transitional qualities associated with some anocracies that are predicative of civil conflict. The magnitude of the transition also affects the probability of a civil conflict. The higher magnitude of the transition, the higher likelihood of civil war.

However, some international relations experts use the polity data series in the formulation of their hypothesis and study, which presents a problem because the Polity IV system uses violence and civil war as factors in its computation of a country's polity score. Two components, "the degree of institutionalization, or regulation, of political competition," and "the extent of government restriction on political competition," are problematic to use in any study involving Polity IV and civil war in anocratic governments. In the numeric rating system of one of these parts of Polity IV, unregulated, "may or may be characterized by violent conflict among partisan groups." The other component states that "there are relatively stable and enduring political groups - but competition among them is intense, hostile, and frequently violent." The only thing that can be deduced concretely is that political violence tends to lead to civil war. There is no solid evidence to support that political institutions in an anocracy leads to civil war.

Broadness and complexity
While the first three characteristics capture the instability of anocracies, another feature of anocratic regimes is their broad descriptiveness. Anocracy describes a regime type with a mix of institutional characteristics that either constrains or promotes the democratic process, "encapsulating a complex category encompassing many institutional arrangements." Although anocracies demonstrate some capacity for civil society and political participation, their autocratic and democratic counterparts show considerably more or less capabilities. Thus, while scholars are easily able to identify democratic and autocratic regimes based on their respective characteristics, anocracies become a wider, "catchall" category for all other regimes. However, despite its broadness and complexity, the convention is still used because of its relevance to civil instability as well as its usage in the polity data series.

Examples

Africa
At the end of World War II, European control over its colonial territories in Africa diminished. During the period of decolonization in the 1950s and 1960s, many African states gained independence. Although these newly independent African states could become either democratic or autocratic regimes, manageability issues made way for autocratic regimes to come into power. Most underdeveloped African states that did become democracies in this time period failed within 10 years and transitioned to autocracies. For about 30 years after 1960, the number of autocratic regimes in Africa rose from 17 to 41 as the number of democratic regimes stayed around five. After the collapse of communism in Europe and the rise of democratization at the end of the Cold War, Africa experienced a major political transformation. In the 1990s, the number of autocracies decreased to nine, and the number of democracies increased to nine since many African countries remained anocratic. By 2012, Africa had three autocracies, 17 democracies, and 30 anocracies. By 2013, most African countries had remained either open or closed anocracies. As African states transition from autocracy to anocracy and from anocracy to democracy, electoral conflicts and violence remain prevalent.

Nigeria
With a polity score of four in 2014, Nigeria is categorized as an open anocracy, transitioning closer to democracy than autocracy. In recent years, Nigeria has displayed characteristics of anocratic regimes including political corruption and electoral riggings. Following years of military rule after gaining independence in 1960 to 1999 except for 1979 to 1983, the 2007 general elections marked the first time in Nigerian history that political leadership was passed from one civilian to another by an election. However, in late 2006, just months before the April 2007 general election, ex-President Olusegun Obasanjo used state institutions to try to defeat political opponents as he attempted to win a third presidential term. Using the Economic and Financial Crimes Commission (EFCC), an institution created by his administration, the former president had some of his political enemies and their family members arrested or detained. Despite the electoral conflicts, some Nigerians view their country as running on democratic principles because military power has been controlled by political elites for 15 years. However, those electoral conflicts, combined with state governors using legislative and judiciary power, to win elections repeatedly suggests that Nigeria remains an anocracy. Ex-President Goodluck Jonathan was accused of abusing his power in an attempt to remain in office after 2015, despite claiming his presidency advocated democratic principles. The Administration of President Buhari has also seen State forces used in ways that can be at times described as anti democratic by State Governors and agents of the Federal Government

Somalia
Somalia was labeled as an autocracy from 1969 to 2012, with a polity score of negative seven throughout the entire period. From 1969 to 1991, Siad Barre was the military dictator of the Somali Democratic Republic. After Barre was overthrown in 1991, two decades of chaos ensued, as civil war broke out and rival warlords fought to gain power. The consistent fighting of tribal leaders and warlords made the country unable to deal with natural disasters, droughts, and famines, which caused a combined 500,000 deaths in famines in 1992 and 2010 to 2012.

After years of being split into fiefdoms, the main Somali warlords established an agreement to appoint a new president in 2004. However, the plan failed when Islamist insurgents, including the radical youth militia al-Shabaab, which has links to Al-Qaeda, gained control over much of southern Somalia from 2006 to 2008. With the assistance of international peace keeping offensives and the Kenyan army, the Islamist insurgents were forced to withdraw in 2012. In the same year, the first formal parliament in over 20 years was appointed in Somalia. The newly formed parliament chose Hassan Sheikh Mohamud as the new president in September 2012. With international assistance, the Somali government has been able to rebuild itself and the country has recently been relatively more stable. Since 2013, Somalia has retained a polity score of five and is listed as an open anocracy.

Uganda
In the 1990s, Uganda transitioned from an autocracy to a closed anocracy. Although Uganda saw a jump in its polity score in the mid-2000s, it has retained a polity score of negative two for the last decade. Uganda is populated by many ethnic groups with the Buganda group, the largest of these groups, making up 17% of the population. Since Uganda gained independence in 1962, incessant conflict has ensued between approximately 17 ethnic groups, which has led to political instability. The dictator Idi Amin was responsible for around 300,000 deaths under his rule from 1971 to 1979, and guerrilla warfare from 1980 to 1985 under Milton Obote killed 100,000 people. Human rights abuses under both rulers led to even more deaths from 1971 to 1985.

In the early 1990s, Uganda experienced large-scale violent dissent as the country experienced more rebellions and guerrilla warfare. As a result of the wars, the government called for nonparty presidential and legislative elections in the mid-1990s. A period of relative peace followed, as a common law legal system was instituted in 1995. Uganda transitioned from an authoritarian regime to a closed anocracy. The political situation of Uganda has seen little improvement under the rule of Yoweri Museveni, who has maintained power since 1986 because other political organizations in Uganda cannot sponsor candidates. Only Museveni and his National Resistance Movement (NRM) can operate without any limitations leading to electoral conflicts and violence.

Zimbabwe
When Robert Mugabe gained presidency in 1980, Zimbabwe was listed as an open anocracy with a polity score of four. By 1987, the country had almost fully transitioned to an authoritarian regime, with a polity score of negative six, which made it a closed anocracy. After remaining on the border between an authoritarian regime and closed anocracy for over a decade, Zimbabwe's polity score increased in the early 2000s. Currently, Zimbabwe has a polity score of 4, making it an open anocracy. In recent years, Zimbabwe has moved toward becoming a more democratic regime, but electoral conflicts and human rights violations still exist leaving Zimbabwe as an anocratic regime.

When Zimbabwe was a closed anocracy in the late 1990s, the country experienced major human rights violations. Labor strikes were common, as employers did not listen to the demands of their employees, and real wages fell by 60 percent from 1992 to 1997. The labor strikes that occurred in the late 1990s were declared illegal by the government of Zimbabwe, and blame was put on poor working-class citizens. As labor laws continued hurting workers, health services declined, and housing projects stagnated.

Since becoming president in 1980, Mugabe used a variety of tactics to remain in power that led to major electoral conflicts over the years. In the March 2008 presidential election, the electoral body reported that Morgan Tsvangirai, the presidential candidate of the opposing party, had received more votes than Mugabe. However, because Tsvangirai received 48% of the vote and not an absolute majority, it was announced that a runoff would take place. Using intimidation tactics, including murder threats, Mugabe and his party forced Tsvangirai to withdraw from the runoff, and Mugabe remained in power. A US-led United Nations security council to impose sanctions on Mugabe failed, and talks about powersharing between Mugabe and Tsvangirai ended soon after the runoff. After an opposing party candidate, Lovemore Moyo, won Speaker of the Legislature, a powersharing coalition was finally set up in September 2008 in which Tsvangirai was named prime minister. The polity score of Zimbabwe had increased from one to four by 2010. However, in 2013, Mugabe won his seventh straight presidential term, and the election was criticized for being rigged to allow Mugabe to win.

Asia

Burma
Burma, or the Republic of the Union of Myanmar, is classified as an anocracy because of adverse armed conflict, changes in leadership, and the partly-democratic, partly-authoritarian nature of its government. Burma had a representative democracy after it gained independence from Britain. Soon after independence was achieved, there was an outbreak of various insurgencies and rebellions. Many of the insurgencies were caused by divides along ethnic lines. One of the most prominent civil wars in Burma, the Kachin conflict, restarted in 2011, and Burma is still embroiled in a civil war.

Burma has had a history of changes in government, usually by military coups. In 1962, General Ne Win enacted a military coup and created the Burma Socialist Programme Party, which held power for 26 years. On September 18, 1988, General Saw Maung led another military coup to return the government to the people and created the State Law and Order Restoration Council (SLORC), which was renamed State Peace and Development Council. After holding free and legitimate elections in May 1990, the National League for Democracy (NLD) won with Aung San Suu Kyi at its head. However, the military junta refused to give up power to the NLD.
The Union Solidarity and Development Party (USDP), backed by the military, won the 2010 elections and the military government was dissolved soon afterward.

The Burmese government shows signs of having democratic as well as authoritarian features. Burma is a pseudodemocratic state because of the elections that were held in 1990 and 2010. However, both elections were problematic because the military did not transfer power to the winning party in 1990, and the 2010 elections were seen as illegitimate. Violent repression is the biggest signifier of the authoritarian nature of the Burmese government. The Win regime was marked by extreme oppression and human rights abuses and as a result, Burmese civilians and students protested against the government. The Burmese government responded violently to the protests and the Tatmadaw, or Myanmar Armed Forces, killed many of the protestors. After the coup in 1988 by General Maung, the protests were violently suppressed again, as Maung's government proceeded to implement martial law to bring peace and order.

Cambodia
Cambodia is an example of anocracy because its government displays democratic and authoritarian aspects. Under the United Nations Transitional Authority in Cambodia, Cambodia implemented an electoral system based on proportional representation, held legitimate elections, and it instituted a parliamentary system of government. The constitution, created on 21 September 1993 indicated that Cambodia was a parliamentary government with a constitutional monarchy. Cambodia exhibited signs of a democratic state, especially with the presence of elections and a proportionally-representative government. After the coup in 1997, the Cambodian government has taken more authoritarian measures to keep peace in the country. Protests have been suppressed violently by pro-government forces and many human rights activists and protesters have been arrested by the Cambodian government.

Cambodia shows signs of being an unstable government with abrupt changes in leadership, making it an anocratic. The initial elections led to FUNCINPEC's victory, under the leadership of Prince Ranariddh. FUNCINPEC and the Buddhist Liberal Democratic Party won 68 out of 120 seats in the National Assembly. The Cambodian People's Party, led by Hun Sen, refused to accept the outcome. Although a coalitional government was created with Prince Ranariddh as the First Prime Minister and Sen as the Second Prime Minister, the deal failed as Sen led a coup d'état on July 5, 1997. Sen and the CPP have been in power ever since, and the CPP recently won a general election against the Cambodia National Rescue Party, led by Sam Rainsy.

Thailand
Thailand's history of leadership changes make it an anocratic state. Thailand has been in a constant state of political upheaval since 1993. Coups d'état and widespread political corruption are the main causes of political instability. Thailand experienced a period of political liberalization under General Prem Tinsulanonda, an unelected prime minister from 1980 to 1988. A series of coups ensued soon afterward. General Suchinda Kraprayoon led a coup against Prime Minister Chatichai Choonhavan on February 23, 1991. After the Black May incident, Suchinda was forced to resign, and Anand Panyarachun was assigned the position of temporary prime minister. Thaksin Shinawatra won the 2001 elections and became prime minister; he won again in 2005 but was deposed in the 2006 Thai coup d'état. After a new constitution was adopted, Samak Sundaravej and his People's Power Party (Thailand) won the 2007 election, and Sundaravej became prime minister. However, a conflict of interest caused Sundaravej to be ousted, and Somchai Wongsawat was elected as the new prime minister. Shortly after his election, Prime Minister Wongsawat and the PPP was found guilty of electoral fraud, and Wongsawat lost his position. Abhisit Vejjajiva's election as the next prime minister was met with opposition by "Red Shirts." On July 3, 2011, Yingluck Shinawatra, belonging to the Pheu Thai Party, was elected as prime minister. After mass protests in 2013, Shinawatra was deposed by a military coup led by General Prayut Chan-o-cha, who is the current prime minister.

Successful transitions to democracy
Anocratic regimes are often implicitly mentioned in democratic transition literature. There are numerous examples of regimes that have successfully transitioned to democracy from anocracy.

Mexico
Mexico's transition from an anocratic to democratic regime occurred in the 1980s and the 1990s on the electoral stage. The period was characterized by the rise of multiple parties, the decline of power of the Institutional Revolutionary Party, and the decentralization of power from the national level into municipalities. The democratization process produced competitive elections with less voting fraud, culminating with the 1994 presidential election. There was also a documented increase in the role of media and journalism during this period, which led to the creation of various special interest groups, such as those representing the environment, indigenous rights, and women's rights. However, violence continues to remain a characteristic of Mexico's local elections.

Taiwan
At the end of the Chinese Civil War in 1949, the Republic of China retreated to the island of Taiwan. The constitution used by the Republic of China to govern Taiwan guaranteed civil rights and elections, but it was ignored in favor of rule under martial law. Taiwan's pro-democracy movement gained momentum in the early 1980s and coalesced into the formation of the Democratic Progressive Party in 1986. Over the next decade, Taiwan attempted to restore the civil rights promised in its constitution, culminating with the Taiwan's first direct presidential election in 1996. Taiwan continues to move towards a consolidated democracy.

Ghana
In 1991, Ghana was listed as an autocratic regime with a polity score of negative seven. By the late 1990s and early 2000s, Ghana was an open anocracy. In 2005, Ghana successfully transitioned from an open anocracy to a democracy as it has retained a polity score of eight since 2006. A major part of Ghana's success can be attributed to its management of the electoral process to decrease electoral conflict. Since Ghana began having elections in 1992, the strengthening of government institutions such as a strong, independent electoral commission has decreased electoral conflict. The existence of civil society organizations and a media aimed at ensuring democratic principles have also helped manage electoral conflicts in Ghana. For example, Ghana's 2008 elections ended peacefully, as political institutions were able to respond to electoral challenges and advance democratic principles and processes. However, some electoral conflicts remain on a small scale in Ghana such as ethnic vote blocking, vote buying, intimidation, and hate speeches. Yet, even with those minor conflicts, Ghana has been able to transform from an anocracy to a democracy by decreasing electoral conflicts.

Etymology 
Use of the word "anocracy" in English dates back to at least 1950, when R. F. C. Hull's reprinted translation of Martin Buber's 1946 work Pfade in Utopia [Paths in Utopia] distinguished "an-ocracy" (neoclassical compound: ἀκρατία akratia) from "anarchy" - "not absence of government but absence of domination". Moreover, the word "anocracy" is a mistranslation by Hull of Buber's word "Akratie". The correct translation should have been "acracy." As it is, the only possible interpretation of "anocracy," is as a Latin-Greek compound "ano-cracy" (like "merito-cracy")

See also
 Autocracy
 Absolute monarchy
 Defective democracy
 Despotism
 Dictatorship
 Illiberal democracy

References

Democratization
Mixed government
Types of democracy